XECT-AM is a radio station on 1190 AM in Monterrey, Nuevo León. It carries a hybrid format of talk and pop music.

History
XECT received its concession on August 20, 1971. Owned by Clemente Serna Alvear, of the Serna family that founded Radio Programas de México in the 1940s, XECT was a 500-watt daytimer. Serna transferred the station to Canal 1190, S.A., in 1975. In the early 1990s, XECT went from broadcasting with 500 watts during the day and 100 at night to its current power levels by way of technical changes authorized in 1992 and 1998.

References

Mass media in Monterrey